Vaisseaux Bank is an area of shallow water eight kilometres from the south coast of Grande-Terre, in the French Caribbean département of Guadeloupe. It is a significant hazard to shipping. Species of Haplocochlias have been identified around the bank.

References 

Landforms of Guadeloupe
Undersea banks of the Atlantic Ocean
Landforms of France